Agate Beach is located in Stanton Township, Michigan near Toivola and is named after the agate rocks that are found on the shore.

References 

Beaches of Michigan